William Albert Murray (born 6 October 1941) is an English actor, best known for playing Don Beech in The Bill from 1995 to 2004, Johnny Allen in the BBC soap opera EastEnders from 2005 to 2006, and Captain John Price in the video games Call of Duty 4: Modern Warfare, Call of Duty: Modern Warfare 2, and Call of Duty: Modern Warfare 3.

Often known for portraying "hard man" characters, he has also starred in McVicar (1980), Essex Boys (2000),  One in the Chamber (2012), We Still Steal the Old Way (2016), Nemesis (2021) and the Rise of the Footsoldier film series (2007–2021).

Early life
Murray was born in Forest Gate, Essex and grew up in Upton Park, East London, one of three children of Timothy and Vera Murray; his father was a plasterer, nightclub bouncer and a boxing champion. Murray attended St. Edward's Catholic Primary and St Bonaventure's Catholic School. After leaving school at fourteen, Murray worked as a shelf-stacker at a Co-Op supermarket in Canning Town and at the local docks cleaning the dirt out of oil tankers. He also had football trials for West Ham United and boxed for the Reggie and Ronnie Kray-owned West Ham Boxing Club. Murray became good friends with the Krays to the extent that he accompanied them on holiday to Spain. The Kray twins paid £400 for him to go to East 15 Acting School as a teenager, because they "liked his attitude". They never asked for the money back, and Murray later appeared as a character witness for Charlie Kray who had been accused of smuggling cocaine.

Career
Murray made his acting debut in the 1963 film The Wrong Arm of the Law before having minor uncredited roles in What a Crazy World (1963) and Two Left Feet (1965). This was followed by larger roles in the films Poor Cow (1967), Corruption (1968), Up the Junction (1968) and Performance (1970). From the 1970s through to the early 1990s, he made appearances in a wide variety of television series such as Softly, Softly, The Sweeney, The Professionals, Minder, Bergerac and Casualty. He was also among those considered for the role of Derek "Del Boy" Trotter in the BBC TV series Only Fools and Horses before it finally went to David Jason. Other notable film roles include the role of Joey in the hit 1980 film McVicar (1980). 

In 1995, he took on the role of DS Don Beech in the ITV police drama series The Bill appearing as a regular cast member from early 1995 to late 2000. In 2001 he reprised the role in a special spin-off episode entitled "Beech on the Run". This was followed by the six-part mini-series Beech is Back. In 2004 he made his final appearance as Beech for a guest stint in five episodes, in which his character escaped from prison and is now back 'on the run'. Before playing Don Beech in the series, Murray played a different character, DI Jackson, in an episode in 1989.

In late 2004, he joined the cast of BBC soap opera EastEnders and played gangland figure Johnny Allen. This was Murray's second role within the series, as he previously appeared as loan shark Mr. X for two episodes in 1991. Murray's character as Johnny Allen made his first appearance on 4 January 2005, and became the show's main antagonist upon terrorizing numerous characters on the programme - including Peggy Mitchell; her sons Phil Mitchell and Grant Mitchell; their cousin Billy Mitchell, whom Johnny initially employed in his criminal empire; Phil and Grant's ex-lover Sharon Watts; her godmother Pauline Fowler; his daughter's best friend Stacey Slater; and even his own henchman Jake Moon. During his time on the show, Johnny killed fellow mob boss Andy Hunter on the show's 20th anniversary episode by throwing him from a motorway bridge. His character later arranged for Jake's brother Danny Moon to kill Sharon's husband Dennis Rickman on New Year's Eve 2005. He departed from the show in March 2006 when his character was jailed after his daughter Ruby Allen forced him to confess to having Dennis murdered and killing Andy himself. He made a brief return to EastEnders in October 2006 when his character was killed off after he succumbed to a heart attack in prison, though not before trying to arrange the death of Ruby's boyfriend and Stacey's brother Sean Slater upon learning that he plans to extract her family assets. For his performance as Johnny Allen  Murray won the 'Best Villain' award at the British Soap Awards in May 2006.

Following his departure from EastEnders, Murray appeared in several British films such as Rollin' with the Nines (2006), Doghouse (2009) and Dead Cert (2010). He also played Mickey Steele in three films from the Rise of the Footsoldier film series, those being Rise of the Footsoldier (2007), Rise of the Footsoldier 3: The Pat Tate Story (2017) and Rise of the Footsoldier: Origins (2021).

He also provided the voice of Captain John Price in the video games Call of Duty 4: Modern Warfare (2007), Call of Duty: Modern Warfare 2 (2009) and Call of Duty: Modern Warfare 3 (2011) and fronted the adverts for Injury Lawyers 4 U, a compensation claims company in the UK.

Murray's later career has mainly consisted of film roles, including The Rise and Fall of a White Collar Hooligan (2012), One in the Chamber (2012) and We Still Steal the Old Way (2016). He headlined the crime film Nemesis (2021) and starred alongside Lee Majors, Danny Trejo and Ian Ogilvy in the action-thriller film Renegades (2022).

Personal life
Murray has four children. A son and daughter from his first marriage to Maureen, and two daughters from his second marriage to Elaine. Jaime Murray, one of his daughters from his second marriage is an actress who is best known for starring in the television series Hustle, as well as playing Lila Tournay in season two of Dexter.

In 1998, Murray appeared in court after he and 3 other men allegedly attacked two men who they believed were supplying drugs to their daughters. Murray said that he suffered a nervous breakdown and slept rough on the set of The Bill for months as a court order banned him from living in his home county of Essex after he was charged with intimidating a witness involved in the case. He also admitted that the court case had put a strain on his marriage. Murray was cleared of assault, having claimed that at the time he was "suffering from a mouth abscess and a cracked collarbone and was in no condition to hit anyone".
One of the men attacked was quoted as saying that they wished the case had never gone to court, stating "I deserved everything I got".

In April 2011, it was reported that Murray had been charged with assault of his wife and daughter. In July 2011, it was confirmed that the assault case against Murray had been dropped.

Outside of acting, Murray is involved in property investment and owns and rents out lock-ups, flats and garages across East London.

He is a West Ham United football club fan, and a supporter of the Conservative Party.

Filmography

Film

Television

Video games

References

External links
 
 Billy Murray's EastEnders Profile
 The compensation claims company Billy Murray fronts

English male soap opera actors
English male film actors
English male voice actors
English expatriates in the United States
Alumni of East 15 Acting School
People from Bethnal Green
People from Forest Gate
1941 births
Living people
People educated at St Bonaventure's Catholic School